San Sebastian is an indie pop rock band from Hamilton, Ontario, Canada. Formerly known as Pumps, they broke out on to the scene after appearing on the MuchMusic original series, disBAND.

Biography
Formerly known as "Pumps", San Sebastian is two sets of brothers and Ted Paterson. They describe themselves as five close friends from the Hamilton music scene who came together in late 2008 to lay down the foundations of a rock 'n roll band. In 2010 they became well known after appearing on the MuchMusic original series, disBAND. After appearing on the show, they were signed to Universal Canada.

The members of the band are singer Mike Veerman, guitarist Brodie Dawson, bassist Greg Veerman, guitarist Sean Dawson, and drummer Ted Paterson.

Since their inception San Sebastian have built a strong and loyal support base while twice selling out of their independent 6 song EP. In 2009, the band won the "New Artist/Group of the Year" award at the Hamilton Music Awards.

In May 2010 the band released their first single "Wake Up" via ITunes while simultaneously releasing a video as well.
On May 11, 2010, bassist Greg Veerman wrote on MuchMusic's blog, informing fans that their debut album would be released Summer 2010. The band's second single "Young Youth" was chosen as the iTunes single of the week on August 26, 2010, and the video for Young Youth was released November 26, 2010. Bassist Greg Veerman updated fans on their debut album, the band is currently aiming for an early 2011 release.

On October 4, 2011, the band released their debut LP "Relations"

On July 16, 2015, the band announced on their Facebook page that they had been disbanded for some time and all had moved onto their own individual projects

Current members
Brodie Dawson - Guitar
Greg Veerman - Bass
Mike Veerman - Vocals
Sean Dawson - Guitar
Ted Paterson - Drums

Discography

Studio albums

Singles

Music videos

References

External links
 https://web.archive.org/web/20111123183633/http://sansebastianmusic.com/

Musical groups established in 2008
Musical groups disestablished in 2015
Musical groups from Hamilton, Ontario
Canadian indie rock groups
2008 establishments in Ontario
2015 disestablishments in Ontario